Coleophora argyrella is a moth of the family Coleophoridae. It is found in southern Russia and Syria.

The larvae feed on the shoots of Alhagi pseudalhagi.

References

argyrella
Moths described in 1861
Moths of Europe
Moths of Asia